Vasa Ostojić or Vasilije Ostojić (1730–1791) was a Serbian Baroque painter of icons and frescoes.

Life
Ostojić was born in Sremski Karlovci, Archduchy of Austria in 1730.

He worked on churches in Sremski Karlovci with monk-painter Amvrosije Janković. He was once Dimitrije Bačević's pupil and assistant.

His best-known works are the Serbian Orthodox Church of the Assumption (Uspenska crkva) in Novi Sad, St. Nicholas in Irig and Neradin (1760), then the iconostasis in the Orthodox church in Voganj and the iconostasis in the monastery church of Rakovac, the iconostasis of the Church of Saint Demetrius in Buda (lost in the Great Tabán Fire of 1810), and arguably the most important one, the iconostasis in the Annunciation Church in Szentendre.

Ostojić was under the influences of Russian and Ukrainian Baroque masters.

Later in life, he was ennobled for his artistic achievements.

Ostojić died in Novi Sad, Archduchy of Austria in 1791.

See also
List of painters from Serbia

References

1730 births
1791 deaths
People from Sremski Karlovci
18th-century Serbian painters
18th-century male artists
Artists from Novi Sad
Habsburg Serbs